Ethiopian Airlines operates a fleet of Airbus A350, Boeing 737, Boeing 767, Boeing 777, Boeing 787 and Bombardier Dash Q-400 aircraft.

Current fleet

, the Ethiopian Airlines fleet consists of the following aircraft:

Aside from the equipment shown above, the airline uses a number of DA40NGs for training purposes. Ethiopian Airlines had the largest dedicated cargo fleet in Africa, .

Recent developments
In , Ethiopian Airlines signed a preliminary agreement to buy up to ten Boeing 787 Dreamliners (five firm orders plus five options), becoming the first African carrier to order 787s. On , Boeing announced that Ethiopian had exercised its purchase rights and confirmed a firm order for ten aircraft.

During the 2009 Dubai Air Show, Ethiopian placed an order for 12 Airbus A350-900s, initially scheduled for delivery between 2016 and 2019. In , Ethiopian Airlines announced a firm order for ten Boeing 737-800 Next Generation aircraft in a deal worth US$767 million.

In , the company announced an order for four Boeing 777Fs in a deal worth  billion; Ethiopian Airlines is the first African carrier to order the aircraft. These four will join two others the airline will lease from GECAS. The first was received in mid .

In , the first Dreamliner was delivered to the airline, which became the third airline to operate the type on scheduled flights, preceded only by All Nippon Airways and Japan Airlines. In early  the same year, Ex-Im Bank approved around  million for Boeing to support the development of GE90-equipped long-haul aircraft for Ethiopian Airlines. In  the carrier announced a firm order for 20 Boeing 737 MAX 8s and commitments for 15 more. In , Ethiopian Airlines had the most numerous fleet in Africa. In 2015 the airline planned to buy 15 to 20 of Boeing's new 777X planes worth about $7.4 billion at list prices. Although the airline had initially planned to buy Airbus' A350-1000 jets, it switched to the 777X as it is more suitable for operations at their high-altitude hub in Addis Ababa. It was the first airline in Africa to acquire a Boeing 787 full-flight simulator.

At the 2017 Paris Airshow, Ethiopian announced an additional firm order for 10 Airbus A350-900s, and committed to purchasing two Boeing 777 Freighter aircraft. The airline also exercised its options for 10 Boeing 737 MAX 8s they had from their original order in 2014, extending the largest 737 MAX order by an African carrier. In October 2017, the airline took delivery of its first Boeing 787-9 Dreamliner, making it the first airline in Africa to take delivery and operate the type. During the 2017 Dubai Airshow, Ethiopian Airlines placed a firm order for four Boeing 777 Freighters, valued at more than $1.3 billion at list prices; these aircraft will be powered with GE90-115B engines.

In January 2018, Ethiopian Airlines' Cargo and Logistics Services signed an agreement with aircraft lessor GECAS to lease two Boeing 737-800SF freighters. With deliveries set for June 2018 and January 2019 respectively, these passenger aircraft will be converted into freighter aircraft by Miami, Florida-based Aeronautical Engineers Inc. (AEI). Later that year, Ethiopian Airlines placed a repeat order for the Bombardier Q400 turboprop aircraft. This additional purchase includes a firm order for 10 Q400s in a deal worth  million plus purchase rights for five additional aircraft of the type. In June, Ethiopian Airlines took delivery of its 100th aircraft, a Boeing 787-9; making history as the first airline in Africa to operate a total of 100 aeroplanes in its fleet as part of its fleet expansion and modernisation. The airline took delivery of its first Boeing 737 MAX 8 in July 2018.

In May 2019, Ethiopian Airlines reached an agreement with the government of Ghana, foreshadowing the setup of a new national airline in Accra to rejuvenate its aviation sector. According to The Reporter, the coming airline is supposed to be home-based, and Ghana, as well as its private sector, will have a minimum of 51 percent stake in the development.

In March 2022, Ethiopian Airlines signed an MoU for five Boeing 777-8 freighters to complement its existing Boeing 777F fleet, becoming the second airline to order the next generation freighter jet. In July 2022, Ethiopian Airlines upsized four of its original Airbus A350-900 orders to the larger A350-1000.

Historical fleet

Following is a list of equipment previously operated by Ethiopian. Helicopters and light aircraft were available for leasing to Government agencies as well as to be used on natural resources projects.

 Airbus A330-200
 Airbus A340-300
 Antonov An-12BP
 ATR 42-300
 Beechcraft Model 18
 Bell 47
 Boeing 707-320C
 Boeing 720B
 Boeing 727-200
 Boeing 737-200
 Boeing 737-400F
 Boeing 747-200F
 Boeing 747-300

 Boeing 757-200
 Boeing 767-200ER
 Cessna 180
 Convair CV-240
 Douglas C-47
 Douglas C-47A
 Douglas C-47B
 Douglas C-53
 Douglas DC-3D
 Douglas DC-6A
 Douglas DC-6B
 De Havilland Canada DHC-5A Buffalo
 De Havilland Canada DHC-6
 De Havilland Canada DHC-7-100
 Fokker 50
 Lockheed L-100-30
 Lockheed L-749 Constellation
 McDonnell Douglas MD-11
 Piper PA-18 Super Cub

Notes

References 

fleet
Lists of aircraft by operator